The Knowledge is a 1979 British comedy-drama television film about a group of men and a woman doing "The Knowledge", the training required to become a London taxi driver. It was directed by Bob Brooks with an ensemble cast including  Nigel Hawthorne, Mick Ford, Jonathan Lynn and Maureen Lipman.

Plot 
Four out of work Londoners apply to do "The Knowledge" to become London taxi drivers. They have to contend with learning approximately 15,842 streets and 468 set routes as well as Mr Burgess, a notoriously sadistic examiner from the Public Carriage Office.

Cast 
 Nigel Hawthorne as Mr Burgess
 Mick Ford as Chris Matthews
 Kim Taylforth as Janet
 Jonathan Lynn as Ted Margolies
 David Ryall as Titanic
 Michael Elphick as Gordon Weller
 Maureen Lipman as Brenda Weller
 Lesley Joseph as Val
 Gary Holton as Eddie Hairstyle
 June Watson as Lilian
 Philippa Howell as Miss Stavely

Production 
In 1978 Jack Rosenthal received a telephone call from Bob Brooks, an American who had lived in London for many years, wanting to make a film about something "exclusive to London". After some discussion they decided on "The Knowledge", the training and testing required to become a driver of a hackney carriage. They initially pitched the idea to Euston Films as a feature-length drama before settling on the concept of a comedy drama. Executive producer Verity Lambert agreed to commission a 90-minute television film, despite reservations that Rosenthal and Brooks would struggle working together. Rosenthal researched the story by accompanying taxi drivers around London to collect their stories about doing The Knowledge. Lambert later recalled "Jack Rosenthal and Bob Brooks had this good ideait was Bob's idea and Jack wrote it."

It was the first production by Euston Films to make use of Steadicam.

In his autobiography, Rosenthal describes Nigel Hawthorne as "such a lovely actor" who "gives a superlative, unforgettable comic performance as Mr Burgess, based on a real-life, notoriously sadistic examiner".

Reception 
The Knowledge was nominated for a BAFTA in the category Television, Best Single Play in 1980.

When shown in 1995 on Channel Four during a Thames Television tribute, film historian Geoff Phillips described it as "certainly the best TV play Britain has ever produced".

In 2000 it was voted #83 in the BFI TV 100.

A theatrical adaptation of the film, directed by Maureen Lipman, was staged at the Charing Cross Theatre in London, running from 4 September through 11 November 2017. The cast included Steven Pacey as Mr Burgess.

References

External links 
 
 The Knowledge at BFI Screenonline.

1979 films
1979 comedy films
Films about taxis
1970s English-language films
1970s British films
British comedy television films